Johnnycake Town, also called Journeycake Town, is a settlement settled in the 18th century. Currently unnamed, it is located in what is now Catonsville, Maryland.

The village was settled by Europeans and was named after its tavern, popular for baking and selling johnnycakes to travelers every morning. It was known for being a stopping place for travelers, where they would rest their horses. In Real stories from Baltimore County history, Isobel Davidson states:

Although Johnnycake Town is currently unnamed and does not appear on maps, its main road, Johnnycake Road, still exists.

References

Towns in Maryland
Catonsville, Maryland